Landsberger Allee is a railway station in the Prenzlauer Berg district of Berlin, close to the district's border with Fennpfuhl. The station was named Leninallee in 1950 and has changed name several times since.

Notable places nearby
Schwimm- und Sprunghalle im Europasportpark (SSE)
Velodrom

References

Railway stations in Berlin
Berlin S-Bahn stations
Buildings and structures in Pankow
Railway stations in Germany opened in 1895